General Ræder may refer to:

Georg Ræder (1814–1898), Norwegian Army lieutenant general
Jacques Ræder (1831–1920), Norwegian Army major general
Johan Christopher Ræder (1859–1943), Norwegian Army major general

See also
Paul Rader (born 1934), 15th General of the Salvation Army